The United States Olympic national soccer team may refer to the:
 United States men's national under-23 soccer team
 United States women's national soccer team